The Advance Formation is a geologic formation in British Columbia. It preserves fossils dating back to the Ordovician period.

See also

 List of fossiliferous stratigraphic units in British Columbia

References
 

Ordovician British Columbia
Ordovician northern paleotropical deposits